George Campbell Pike (22 January 1923 – 19 September 2007) was an Australian rules footballer who played with Geelong in the Victorian Football League (VFL).

Pike served in the Australian Army during World War II, seeing active duty if New Guinea.

Notes

External links 

1923 births
2007 deaths
Australian rules footballers from Victoria (Australia)
Geelong Football Club players
East Geelong Football Club players